Soil health is a state of a soil meeting its range of ecosystem functions as appropriate to its environment. In more colloquial terms, the health of soil arises from favorable interactions of all soil components (living and non-living) that belong together, as in microbiota, plants and animals. It is possible that a soil can be healthy in terms of eco-system functioning but not necessarily serve crop production or human nutrition directly, hence the scientific debate on terms and measurements.

Soil health testing is pursued as an assessment of this status but tends to be confined largely to agronomic objectives, for obvious reasons. Soil health depends on soil biodiversity (with a robust soil biota), and it can be improved via soil management, especially by care to keep protective living covers on the soil and by natural (carbon-containing) soil amendments. Inorganic fertilizers do not  necessarily damage soil health if 1) used at appropriate and not excessive rates and 2) if they bring about a general improvement of overall plant growth which contributes more carbon-containing residues to the soil.

Aspects
The term soil health is used to describe the state of a soil in: 
Sustaining plant and animal productivity (agronomic focus);
Enhancing biodiversity (Soil biodiversity) (ecological focus);
Maintaining or enhancing water and air quality (environmental/climate focus);
Supporting human health and habitation.
sequestering carbon

Soil Health has partly if not largely replaced the expression "Soil Quality" that was extant in the 1990s. The primary difference between the two expressions is that soil quality was focused on individual traits within a functional group, as in "quality of soil for maize production" or "quality of soil for roadbed preparation" and so on. The addition of the word "health" shifted the perception to be integrative, holistic and systematic. The two expressions still overlap considerably. Soil Health as an expression derives from organic or "biological farming" movements in Europe, however, well before soil quality was first applied as a discipline around 1990. In 1978, Swiss soil biologist Dr Otto Buess wrote an essay "The Health of Soil and Plants" which largely defines the field even today.

The underlying principle in the use of the term “soil health” is that soil is not just an inert, lifeless growing medium, which modern intensive farming tends to represent, rather it is a living, dynamic and ever-so-subtly changing whole environment. It turns out that soils highly fertile from the point of view of crop productivity are also lively from a biological point of view. It is now commonly recognized that soil microbial biomass is large: in temperate grassland soil the bacterial and fungal biomass have been documented to be 1–/hectare and 2–/ha, respectively.
 
Some microbiologists now believe that 80% of soil nutrient functions are essentially controlled by microbes.

Using the human health analogy, a healthy soil can be categorized as one:
In a state of composite well-being in terms of biological, chemical and physical properties;
Not diseased or infirmed (i.e. not degraded, nor degrading), nor causing negative off-site impacts; 
With each of its qualities cooperatively functioning such that the soil reaches its full potential and resists degradation;
Providing a full range of functions (especially nutrient, carbon and water cycling) and in such a way that it maintains this capacity into the future.

Conceptualisation 

Soil health is the condition of the soil in a defined space and at a defined scale relative to a set of benchmarks that encompass healthy functioning. It would not be appropriate to refer to soil health for soil-roadbed preparation, as in the analogy of soil quality in a functional class. 
The definition of soil health may vary between users of the term as alternative users may place differing priorities upon the multiple functions of a soil.
Therefore, the term soil health can only be understood within the context of the user of the term, and their aspirations of a soil, as well as by the boundary definition of the soil at issue. Finally, intrinsic to the discussion on soil health are many potentially conflicting interpretations, especially ecological landscape assessment vs agronomic objectives, each claiming to have soil health criteria.

Interpretation 
Different soils will have different benchmarks of health depending on the “inherited” qualities, and on the geographic circumstance of the soil.
The generic aspects defining a healthy soil can be considered as follows:
“Productive” options are broad;
Life diversity is broad;
Absorbency, storing, recycling and processing is high in relation to limits set by climate;
Water runoff quality is of high standard;
Low entropy; and,
No damage to, or loss of the fundamental components.

This translates to:
A comprehensive cover of vegetation;
Carbon levels relatively close to the limits set by soil type and climate;
Little leakage of nutrients from the ecosystem;
Biological and agricultural productivity relatively close to the limits set by the soil environment and climate;
Only geological rates of erosion;
No accumulation of contaminants; and,

An unhealthy soil thus is the simple converse of the above.

Measurement 
On the basis of the above, soil health will be measured in terms of individual ecosystem services provided relative to the benchmark.  Specific benchmarks used to evaluate soil health include CO2 release, humus levels, microbial activity, and available calcium.

Soil health testing is spreading in the United States, Australia and South Africa.
Cornell University, a land-grant college in NY State, has had a Soil Health Test since 2006. Woods End Laboratories, a private soil lab founded in Maine in 1975, has offered a soil quality package since 1985. Bost these services combine test for physical (aggregate stability) chemical (mineral balance) and biology (CO2 respiration) which today are considered hallmarks of soil health testing. The approach of other soil labs also entering the soil health field is to add into common chemical nutrient testing a biological set of factors not normally included in routine soil testing. The best example is adding biological soil respiration ("CO2-Burst") as a test procedure; this has already been adapted to modern commercial labs in the period since 2006.

There is however resistance among soil testing labs and university scientists to add new biological tests, primarily since interpretation of soil fertility is based on models from "crop response" studies which match yield to test levels of specific chemical nutrients, and no similar models for interpretation appear to exist for soil health tests. Critics of novel soil health tests argue that they may be insensitive to management changes.

Soil test methods have evolved slowly over the past 40 years. However, in this same time USA soils have also lost up to 75% of their carbon (humus), causing biological fertility and ecosystem functioning to decline; how much is debatable. Many critics of the conventional system say the loss of soil quality is sufficient evidence that the old soil testing models have failed us, and need to be replaced with new approaches. These older models have stressed "maximum yield" and " yield calibration" to such an extent that related factors have been overlooked. Thus, surface and groundwater pollution with excess nutrients (nitrates and phosphates) has grown enormously, and early 2000s measures were reported (in the United States) to be the worst it has been since the 1970s, before the advent of environmental consciousness.

Soil health gap 

Importance of soil for global food security, agro-ecosystem, environment, and human life has exponentially shifted the trends of research towards soil health. However, lack of a site/region specific benchmark has limited the research effort towards understanding the true effect of different agronomic managements on soil health. In 2020, Maharjan and his team, introduces a new term and concept "Soil Health Gap" and described how native land in particular region can help in establishing the benchmark to compare the efficacies of different management practices and at the same time it can be used in understanding quantitative difference in soil health status.

See also
 Dryland salinity
 Ecosystem services
 Soil aggregate stability
 Soil biodiversity
 Soil carbon
 Soil fertility
 Soil functions
 Soil policy (Victoria, Australia)
 Soil quality
 Soil resilience
 Soil structure
 Soil water (retention)

References

Further reading

External links 
Improving Soil pH, Reducing Soil Born Disease and Improving Crop Production
Living Soils (Greenpeace)
NRCS Soil Health and NPK (NRCS)
NRCS Soil Health in Field and Forage Crop Production (NRCS)
WEBINARS on SOIL HEALTH
Soil Health Tool in The Prairie Star
Soil Quality Indicator Sheets
National Look at Groundwater Pollution (USGS)

Land management
Health
Soil science